is a Japanese actor and voice actor from Nagasaki Prefecture. He is affiliated with Aoni Production. He is best known for his roles in Transformers: Armada (as Smokescreen), Higurashi no Naku Koro ni (as Teppei Hōjō), and One Piece (as Gekko Moriah and Jimbei).

Filmography

Television drama
1983
Oshin

Television animation
1988
Soreike! Anpanman (Doctor Hiyari (substitute), Amefuri Oni, Priest Ishiuse)
1994
Mahōjin Guru Guru (Middle-aged weapons-seller, Village Headman Kocchi)
1995
Fushigi Yūgi (High Official #A, Elder)
Ōgon Yūsha Goldran (Sumiinkusu)
Romeo no Aoi Sora (King of Italy)
Slayers (Bandit Boss, Rodimus)
1996
Cinderella Monogatari (Pierre, Hans, Gandis)
Midori no Makibaō (Tachihara)
1997
Chūka Ichiban! (Raache)
Hakugei Densetsu (Cook)
Detective Conan (Ryōta Adachi, henchman)
Super Fisher Grander Musashi (Ossan)
Yūsha Ō GaoGaiGar (High school principal, monitor voice)
1998
Cowboy Bebop (Baker Panchoreno)
Doraemon (Dinosaur hunter)
Grander Musashi RV (Tōru)
Detective Conan (Takagaki)
Nintama Rantarō (Bandit, shopkeeper)
1999
The Big O (Sam)
Detective Conan (Michio Morioka, Shōji Terabayashi, Yūzō Takeda)
Zoids (Gloskov)
2000
Doraemon (Prosecutor)
2001
Galaxy Angel (Superior officer)
2002
Kidō Senshi Gundam SEED (Gerard Garcia)
Detective Conan (Shirō Kawabata, mail clerk)
2003
Detective Conan (Chief, Sōhei Dejima)
Nintama Rantarō (Sagitarō Kuronejū)
2004
Bakuretsu Tenshi (Governor Ishihara)
Galaxy Angel X (Superior officer)
Kaiketsu Zorori (Suzuki Santa)
Detective Conan (Jitsu Shirai)
Samurai Champloo (Daigorō)
Zoids Fuzors (Delegation leader)
2005
Black Jack (Jinmen Kasa)
Doraemon (Kaminari)
Gun x Sword (Bariyo)
Naruto (Mōsō)
2006
Black Jack (Manager)
Black Jack 21 (Debun, cabinet minister)
Code Geass: Hangyaku no Lelouch (Bartley Asprius)
Death Note (Kiichirō Osoreda)
Demashita! Powerpuff Girls Z (Santa Claus)
Higurashi no Naku Koro ni (Teppei Hōjō)
Ginga Densetsu Weed (Ben)
Kiba (King Bakkam)
Majime ni Fumajime: Kaiketsu Zorori (Sōkamone)
Nintama Rantarō (Jinbei Tasogane)
2007
Bokurano (Yūzō Odaka)
Crayon Shin-chan (Konga)
Darker Than Black (Naoyasu Kirihara)
Devil May Cry: The Animated Series (Catholic priest)
Higurashi no Naku Koro ni Kai (Teppei Hōjō)
Detective Conan (Kōsei Tsuchio, Morizō Daiyama)
Pokemon: Diamond & Pearl (Oji-san)
Romeo x Juliet (Conrad)
Ryūsei no Rockman Tribe (Agame)
Shakugan no Shana (Behemoth)
2008
Code Geass: Hangyaku no Lelouch R2 (Bartley Asprius)
GeGeGe no Kitarō 4th series (Jubokko) (ep. 67)
One Piece (Gecko Moria)
Slayers Revolution (Child #A)
Soul Eater (Kaizō Rasputin)
2009
Crayon Shin-chan (Staff member)
Fullmetal Alchemist: Brotherhood (General Raven)
Inazuma Eleven (Seijirō Kira)
Needless (Vonsangar)
Nintama Rantarō (Mansion owner)
Pokemon: Diamond & Pearl (Mitsuzō)
Slayers Evolution-R (Rodimus)
2010
Detective Conan (Kengo Shuntō)
One Piece (Jinbe (ep. 440+), replacing Daisuke Gori)
2011
Mai no Mahō to Katei no Hi (Reizō Tatsumi)
Nurarihyon no Mago (Kuramayama no Ootengu)
Naruto Shippuden (Sabu)
Shakugan no Shana III Final (Behemoth)
2013
The Devil Is a Part-Timer! (Olba Meiyā)
2014
Gundam Build Fighters Try (Mr. Ral) (eps. 5-25)
Garo: The Animation (Garcia)
2015
Gangsta. (Daniel Monroe)
Rampo Kitan: Game of Laplace (Ryūichirō Munakata)
2016
 JoJo's Bizarre Adventure: Diamond Is Unbreakable – Ryōhei Higashikata
2017
Kirakira PreCure a la Mode (Yuu Tachibana)
2018
GeGeGe no Kitarō 6th series (Kaminari) (ep. 5)
2019
Babylon (Ryūichirō Nomaru)

Original video animation (OVA)
Konpeki no Kantai (1993) (Admiral Otowa Kuki, Hiroshi Ogawa)

Drama CDs
Netsujou no Ori de Nemure (????) (Taizou Tamiya)

Theatrical animation
Gekijōban Naruto Daikatsugeki! Yukihime Ninpōchō Dattebayo!! (2004) (Great Devil King)
 Pocket Monsters Advanced Generation the Movie: The Pokémon Ranger and Prince of the Sea - Manaphy (2006) (Tab)
 Doraemon: Nobita's Great Battle of the Mermaid King (2010) (Commander Rosy Grub/Tragis)
 Doraemon: New Nobita's Great Demon—Peko and the Exploration Party of Five (2014) (Kaminari-san)
 Shimajiro in Bookland (2016) (Voice) 
 Dragon Ball Super: Broly (2018) (Paragus)
 The First Slam Dunk (2022) (Mitsuyoshi Anzai)

Theme park ride
Indiana Jones Adventure: Temple of the Crystal Skull (Voice of Paco)

Video games
.hack//G.U. (2006) (Grein)
Injustice: Gods Among Us (2013) (Uncredited voice)
Max Payne (2001) (Deputy Police Chief Jim Bravura, Angelo Punchinello)
Metroid: Other M (2010) (Colonel)
One Piece: Unlimited Cruise (2008) (Gecko Moria)
Ratchet & Clank (2002) (WaterWorker)
Ratchet & Clank: Going Commando (2003) (Waterworker)
Ratchet & Clank Future: Tools of Destruction (2007) (Captain Slag, Plumber)
Spyro the Dragon (1998) (Gnasty Gnorc, Dragon)
Wild Arms 5 (2006) (Captain Bartholomew)
Tokyo Afterschool Summoners Gyūmao (2018)

Tokusatsu
Shuriken Sentai Ninninger (2015) (Youkai Umibōzu) (ep. 17)

Dubbing

Live action film
The 6th Day (Robert Marshall (Michael Rooker))
Australia (Kipling Flynn (Jack Thompson))
The Ballad of Buster Scruggs (Trapper (Chelcie Ross))
Basquiat (The Electrician (Willem Dafoe))
Big Fish (Karl the Giant (Matthew McGrory))
Biker Boyz (Smoke (Laurence Fishburne))
Black Widow (General Dreykov (Ray Winstone))
Bombshell (Roger Ailes (John Lithgow))
The Bone Collector (2002 TV Asahi edition) (Detective Paulie Sellitto (Ed O'Neill))
Bounce (Jim Willer (Joe Morton))
Brawl in Cell Block 99 (Warden Tuggs (Don Johnson))
The Cider House Rules (Arthur Rose (Delroy Lindo))
Clifford the Big Red Dog (Mr. Packard (David Alan Grier))
Cold Case (Detective Will Jeffries (Thom Barry))
The Count (2014 Star Channel edition) (Tailor (Eric Campbell))
The Crown (Winston Churchill (John Lithgow))
Demon Knight (Sheriff Tupper (John Schuck))
Denial (David Irving (Timothy Spall))
Don't Be Afraid of the Dark (William Harris (Jack Thompson))
Dr. Dolittle 2 (Eldon (James Avery))
Dr. Strangelove (General Buck Turgidson (George C. Scott))
Dreamgirls (Marty Madison (Danny Glover))
The Dust Factory (Grandpa Randolph (Armin Mueller-Stahl))
Ed (Tipton (Bill Cobbs))
Fallen (Lou (James Gandolfini))
Frank Herbert's Dune (Baron Vladimir Harkonnen (Ian McNeice))
Fringe (Sanford Harris (Michael Gaston))
From Vegas to Macau (Benz (Hui Shiu-hung))
Get Smart (2011 TV Asahi edition) (Shtarker (Ken Davitian))
The Glenn Miller Story (2000 TV Tokyo edition) (Louis Armstrong)
God of Gamblers II (Uncle Three (Ng Man-tat))
Hard Target (1997 Fuji TV edition) (Randal Poe (Eliott Keener))
The Heartbreak Kid (Doc Cantrow (Jerry Stiller))
The Hole in the Ground (Des Brady (James Cosmo))
Horizon Line (Freddy Wyman (Keith David))
Irréversible (The Man (Philippe Nahon))
Just Wright (Lloyd Wright (James Pickens Jr.))
The King's Speech (Winston Churchill (Timothy Spall))
Lakeview Terrace (Harold Perreau (Ron Glass))
Léon: The Professional (1997 VHS edition) (Mathilda's Father (Michael Badalucco))
The Lost Daughter (Professor Cole (Alexandros Mylonas))
The Man Who Invented Christmas (Edward Chapman (Ian McNeice))
Mary Poppins Returns (Mr. Dawes Jr. (Dick Van Dyke))
Narc (Captain Cheevers (Chi McBride))
The Natural (Pop Fisher (Wilford Brimley))
Not Safe for Work (Alan Z. Emmerich (Christian Clemenson))
Obsessed (Joe Gage (Bruce McGill))
Paddington (Uncle Pastuzo (Michael Gambon))
Paddington 2 (Uncle Pastuzo (Michael Gambon))
Police Story (2012 Ultimate Blu-Ray edition) ("Uncle" Bill Wong (Bill Tung))
Police Story 2 (2010 Blu-Ray edition) ("Uncle" Bill Wong (Bill Tung))
Quantum Apocalypse (Dr. Zulkowski (Jerry Leggio))
Red Dwarf (The Universe)
Rogue Trader (Ron Baker (Nigel Lindsay))
Rush (Lauda's Grandfather (Hans-Eckart Eckhardt))
Safe House (David Barlow (Brendan Gleeson))
A Series of Unfortunate Events (Sir (Don Johnson))
The Specialist (Joe Leon (Rod Steiger))
Strike (Tony Landry (Martin Shaw))
The Terminator (1998 DVD edition) (Ed Traxler (Paul Winfield))
Tin Cup (Earl (Dennis Burkley))
Today You Die (Max (Kevin Tighe))
The Vagabond (2014 Star Channel edition) (Gypsy Chieftain (Eric Campbell))
Victoria & Abdul (Bertie, Prince of Wales (Eddie Izzard))

Animation
The Addams Family (Grandpa Frump)
The Amazing World of Gumball (Mr. Robinson)
Coco (Chicharrón)
The Cuphead Show! (Elder Kettle)
Trolls World Tour (King Quincy)
Alice in Wonderland (DVD edition, additional scene) (Dodo)
Batman: The Animated Series (Rupert Thorne (second voice))
Batman: The Brave and the Bold (Wong Fei)
Bee Movie (Lou Lo Duca)
Bionicle 2: Legends of Metru Nui (Krekka)
Courage the Cowardly Dog (Doctor Vindaloo, Sergeant, Le Quack)
Cow and Chicken (Blind Mudpuddle Johnson)
Curious George (film) (Ivan the Doorman)
Curious George (TV series) (Chef Pisghetti)
Dexter's Laboratory (Koosalagoopagoop)
Donkey Kong Country (Kaptain Skurvy)
Harley Quinn (Darkseid)
Hey Arnold!: The Movie (Grandpa "Steely" Phil)
The Jungle Book 2 (Ranjan's Father)
Kim Possible (Motor Ed)
The Land Before Time series (Daddy Topps)
Lilo & Stitch (Moses Puloki)
Monsters University (Don)
My Friends Tigger & Pooh (Beaver)
My Little Pony: Friendship Is Magic
The Penguins of Madagascar (Maurice, Loi)
Quack Pack (Captain Fedgewick Octavius Storm, Flint Steele)
Recess (Hank)
Ruby Gloom (Skele-T)
Shirt Tales
The Simpsons (Sergeant Seymour Skinner)
Star Wars: The Clone Wars (Gha Nachkt)
Superman: The Animated Series (General Hardcastle)
Teenage Mutant Ninja Turtles (Commander Mozar)
Transformers The Rebirth (Road Zaraku, Punch, Duros)

References

External links 
 Official agency profile 
 

1946 births
Male voice actors from Nagasaki Prefecture
Aoni Production voice actors
Japanese male video game actors
Japanese male voice actors
Living people
20th-century Japanese male actors
21st-century Japanese male actors